The 1878 Taieri by-election was a by-election held on 11 July 1878 during the 6th New Zealand Parliament in the electorate of  in Otago.

The by-election was caused by the resignation of the incumbent MP Donald Reid on 6 June 1878.
  
The by-election was won by William Cutten.

Results
The following table gives the election result:

Notes

Taieri 1878
1878 elections in New Zealand
July 1878 events
Politics of Otago